Tween is a Twitter client for Microsoft Windows, written in Visual Basic .NET.  It is one of the most popular Twitter clients in Japan, and it was open-source.

Summary

Originally, Tween was developed for heavy users.  For this reason, Tween is a Twitter client with various functions.  There are web mode and API mode, and users can switch between modes.  Web mode allows users to avoid API limit's operation.

History

The first beta version was released at Hatena Diary on Nov. 21, 2007.  Originally web mode was an only way to get data, then API mode was implemented.  0.7.7.7 was released on Oct. 2, 2009, and API mode was set as default. 1.2.0.0 or later became Proprietary software.

References

External links
SourceForge Project Page
Tween Wiki

Twitter services and applications
Social software
Free application software
Formerly free software